Luisah Teish (also known as Iyanifa Fajembola Fatunmise) is a teacher and an author, most notably of Jambalaya: The Natural Woman's Book of Personal Charms and Practical Rituals.

Life
Luisah Teish is an African-American, born in New Orleans, Louisiana. Her father, Wilson Allen, Sr. was an African Methodist Episcopal whose parents had been two-generation servants and only one generation away from slavery. Her mother, Serena "Rene" Allen, was a Catholic, of Haitian, French, and Choctaw heritage. Her original ancestry also includes Yoruba West African. She is an Iyanifa and Oshun chief in the Yoruba Lucumi tradition.

In the late 1960s, Teish was a dancer in Katherine Dunham's group, where she learned and performed traditional African and Caribbean dances. After leaving the dance company, she became a choreographer in St. Louis.  In 1969 she joined the Fahami Temple of Amun-Ra, and it was here that she took the name "Luisah Teish", which means "adventuresome spirit". She led the dance troupe of the Black Artists Group (BAG) in St. Louis after the departure of BAG's first dance leader, Georgia Collins.

In the late 1970s she became an initiate and priestess of the Lucumi religion.  She began teaching in 1977.  She currently resides in Oakland, California.

Teish has said in an interview "My tradition is very celebratory - there's always music, dance, song, and food in our services - as well as a sense of reverence for the children.  It's joyful as well as meditative."

One author said she was the "perhaps the most well known.. Yoruba priestess.. of the [San Francisco] Bay Area" (2010). Another author characterized her as "..well known internationally in Goddess circles as a writer and ritual-maker."

Bibliography 

 What Don't Kill is Fattening: Poems by Luisah Teish (1980) Fan Tree Press ASIN: B0007BJRRE
 Jambalaya: The Natural Woman's Book of Personal Charms and Practical Rituals (1988) HarperOne , 
 Carnival of the Spirit: Seasonal Celebrations and Rites of Passage (1994) Harpercollins , 
 Soul Between the Lines: Freeing Your Creative Spirit Through Writing (with Dorothy Randall Gray) (1998)  Avon Books , 
 Eye of the Storm (1998) E P Dutton  , 
 Jump Up: Good Times Throughout the Season with Celebrations from Around the World (2000) Conari Press , 
 What Don’t Kill Is Fattening Revisited: Twenty Years of Poetry, Prose, and Myth (2002) Orikire Publications
 Zulu Shaman: Dreams, Prophecies, and Mysteries (with Vusamazulu Credo Mutwa and Stephen Larsen) (2003)  Destiny Books (New Edition of Song of the Stars) ,

References

External links
 Personal Website

Living people
American Santeríans
Yoruba women writers
Iyalawos
African-American choreographers
American choreographers
American spiritual writers
African-American women writers
African-American writers
American spiritual teachers
Writers from New Orleans
American people of Haitian descent
American people of French descent
American people of Choctaw descent
American people of Yoruba descent
American women non-fiction writers
21st-century African-American people
21st-century African-American women
1948 births